Big Bend is a meander or bend in a deep canyon along the Colorado River, in Grand County, Utah.  It lies within the bounds of Arches National Park at an elevation of 3,980 feet / 1,213 meters, 6.3 miles northeast of Moab, Utah.

References

Colorado River
Arches National Park
Canyons and gorges of Grand County, Utah